Thomas Scott Allen (July 26, 1825December 12, 1905) was an American printer, teacher, newspaper publisher, and politician. He served as the 9th Secretary of State of Wisconsin and served as a Union Army officer throughout the American Civil War.

Background 
Thomas Scott Allen was born in Andover, New York, on July 26, 1825. He attended Oberlin College.

Public office 
He served in the Wisconsin State Assembly in 1857, replacing Democrat Richard M. Smith in representing the new 2nd Iowa County district (Mineral Point, Mifflin, Linden and Waldwick). He was succeeded by fellow Republican Levi Sterling (Sterling, like Smith, was also from Mineral Point).

After the war, he was nominated and confirmed for appointment to the brevet grade of brigadier general of volunteers in 1866.

Civil War 

During the American Civil War, Allen served as a colonel in the 5th Wisconsin Volunteer Infantry Regiment. He was mustered out of the volunteer service on August 2, 1864. On January 13, 1866, President Andrew Johnson nominated Allen for appointment to the grade of brevet brigadier general of volunteers to rank from March 13, 1865, and the United States Senate confirmed the appointment on March 12, 1866.

After the war 

Allen was the Republican Party candidate for Secretary of State in the 1865 election, running alongside Republican gubernatorial candidate and fellow Gettysburg veteran, Lucius Fairchild.  Both Republicans won their elections and were subsequently re-elected in 1867.  Allen served as the state's ninth Secretary of State, from January 1866 through January 1870.

After leaving office, he moved to Oshkosh, Wisconsin, and became the publisher of the Oshkosh Northwestern newspaper.  He ran the Northwestern until 1884.  He then published a German language paper, the Wisconsin Telegraph until 1902.

Allen died of heart failure at his home in Oshkosh on December 12, 1905. He was buried at Riverside Cemetery in Oshkosh.

References

References

 Eicher, John H., and David J. Eicher, Civil War High Commands. Stanford: Stanford University Press, 2001. .
 Hunt, Roger D. and Jack R. Brown, Brevet Brigadier Generals in Blue. Gaithersburg, MD: Olde Soldier Books, Inc., 1990. .

External links

 

|-

1825 births
1905 deaths
Republican Party members of the Wisconsin State Assembly
People from Allegany County, New York
People from Iowa County, Wisconsin
People of Wisconsin in the American Civil War
Oberlin College alumni
Secretaries of State of Wisconsin
19th-century American newspaper publishers (people)
Union Army colonels
Burials in Wisconsin
19th-century American politicians